The 2023 Diamond League is the fourteenth season of the annual series of outdoor track and field meetings, organised by World Athletics. The competition is a revision to the top level athletics series since Diamond League foundation in 2010. The number of Diamond Discipline events is 32, and the dual-meet final format was due to be replaced by a single final, which would have reduced the number of meetings to 14. Each meeting will host a number of Diamond Discipline events and some of these events will not be broadcast. Events losing Diamond Discipline status will feature on the World Athletics Continental Tour, the second tier of track and field meetings.

Schedule
The following fifteen meetings are scheduled to be included in the 2023 season.

Men

Track

Field

Women

Track

Field

Diamond League Disciplines

References

External links

Official website

Diamond League
Diamond League
Diamond League